Apollodorus of Erythrae was a writer of ancient Greece, who spoke of the Erythraean Sibyl as his fellow-citizen.

Notes

Ionians
Ancient Greek writers